Avatar is a 2009 epic science fiction film written and directed by James Cameron. Produced by Lightstorm Entertainment, Dune Entertainment, and Ingenious Film Partners, and distributed by 20th Century Fox, the film stars Sam Worthington, Zoe Saldana, Stephen Lang, Michelle Rodriguez, and Sigourney Weaver. Avatar premiered in London on December 10, and was released in the United States on December 18. Made on a production budget of $237 million,<ref>{{Cite web |last=Patten |first=Dominic |date=December 3, 2009 |title=Avatar' True Cost – and Consequences |url=https://www.thewrap.com/avatars-true-cost-and-consequences-11206/ |url-status=live |archive-url=https://web.archive.org/web/20150702133635/https://www.thewrap.com/avatars-true-cost-and-consequences-11206/ |archive-date=July 2, 2015 |access-date=March 19, 2023 |website=TheWrap}}</ref> Avatar grossed $2.923 billion, breaking numerous box office records, including becoming the highest-grossing film of all time and the first film to gross $2 billion. On the review aggregator website Rotten Tomatoes, the film holds an approval rating of  based on  reviews.Avatar won the 82nd Academy Awards for Best Art Direction, Best Cinematography, and Best Visual Effects, and was nominated for a total of nine, including Best Picture and Best Director. The film garnered four nominations at the 67th Golden Globe Awards ceremony, and received two awards for Best Film – Drama and Best Director. Avatar was nominated for eight British Academy Film Awards, winning Best Production Design and Best Special Visual Effects. The film's achievement in visual effects were praised by the Visual Effects Society, who honored it with six accolades during their annual awards ceremony. Avatar was also nominated for the Directors Guild of America Awards, the Producers Guild of America Awards, and the Writers Guild of America Awards. The film was nominated for ten Saturn Awards and it went on to win all ten at the 36th Saturn Awards ceremony. Zoe Saldana's win for the Saturn Award for Best Actress marked a rare occurrence for an all-CG character.Avatar received recognition from numerous North American critics' associations. The film garnered nine nominations for the Critics' Choice Awards of the Broadcast Film Critics Association where it won Best Action Film and several technical categories. The Austin Film Critics Association and the Dallas-Fort Worth Film Critics Association placed the film on their lists of the year's top ten films. Phoenix Film Critics Society honored the film with Best Cinematography, Best Film Editing, Best Production Design and Best Visual Effect awards and also included it on its top ten films of the year list.  It won two of the St. Louis Gateway Film Critics Association awards for Best Visual Effects and Most Original, Innovative or Creative Film, and the New York Film Critics Online honored the film with its Best Picture award.

In December 2009, the American Film Institute recognized the film and Cameron's advances in CGI effects with their yearly "AFI Moments of Significance" award claiming it "will have profound effects on the future of the art form". In January 2010, it was announced that the Southern Sky Column'', a  quartz-sandstone mountain in the Zhangjiajie National Forest Park in Zhangjiajie, Hunan, China, had been renamed "Avatar Hallelujah Mountain" (阿凡达-哈利路亚山) by the city government in honor of the film.

Accolades

See also
 List of accolades received by Avatar: The Way of Water

References

External links
 

Accolades
Lists of accolades by film